Dasycorixa is a genus of water boatmen in the family Corixidae. There are at least three described species in Dasycorixa.

Species
These three species belong to the genus Dasycorixa:
 Dasycorixa hybrida (Hungerford, 1926)
 Dasycorixa johanseni (Walley, 1931)
 Dasycorixa rawsoni Hungerford, 1948

References

Further reading

 
 

Glaenocorisini
Articles created by Qbugbot